Richmond Park was a railway station of the Glen Iris line in Melbourne, Australia.  The station was situated between Burnley railway station and Heyington railway station. 
The station was built 24 March 1890, but never opened. The station was located in Richmond Park.

References

Disused railway stations in Melbourne
Railway stations in Australia opened in 1890
Railway stations closed in 1890